Aboubacar Bemba Sangare (born 29 September 1999) is a Malian professional footballer who plays as a midfielder for South African club JDR Stars.

Career
After playing for AS Togo-Port in Togo, CS Hammam-Lif in Tunisia and Jomo Cosmos in South Africa's National First Division, Sangare signed for South African Premier Division club Chippa United in summer 2021 on a three-year contract.

References

External links

1999 births
Living people
Malian footballers
Association football midfielders
AS Togo-Port players
CS Hammam-Lif players
Jomo Cosmos F.C. players
Chippa United F.C. players
JDR Stars F.C. players
Tunisian Ligue Professionnelle 1 players
National First Division players
South African Premier Division players
Malian expatriate footballers
Malian expatriate sportspeople in Togo
Malian expatriate sportspeople in Tunisia
Malian expatriate sportspeople in South Africa
Expatriate footballers in Togo
Expatriate footballers in Tunisia
Expatriate soccer players in South Africa